This is a list of shows that have been broadcast (or are planned to be broadcast) on Food Network.

#

3 Days to Open with Bobby Flay – hosted by Bobby Flay
5 Ingredient Fix – hosted by Claire Robinson
24 Hour Restaurant Battle - hosted by Scott Conant
$24 in 24 - hosted by Jeff Mauro
30 Minute Meals – hosted by Rachael Ray
$40 a Day – hosted by Rachael Ray

A

Aarti Party - hosted by Aarti Sequeira
Ace of Cakes – starring Duff Goldman
After Midnight - hosted by Robin Dorian
Alex's Day Off – hosted by Alex Guarnaschelli
Alex vs. America - hosted by Alex Guarnaschelli and Eric Adjepong
All American Festivals – hosted by Tyler Florence and Jim O'Connor
All-Star Academy - hosted by Ted Allen
All-Star Gingerbread Build
All-Star Halloween Spectacular
All-Star Holiday and Homecoming
All-Star Holiday Party
All-Star Kitchen Makeover – three-part special
American Diner Revival - hosted by Ty Pennington and Amanda Freitag
America's Best - hosted by Alton Brown
America's Best Cook - hosted by Ted Allen
Amy Schumer Learns to Cook - hosted by Amy Schumer and Chris Fischer
Appetite for Adventure – hosted by Joey Altman and Tori Ritchie
Ask Aida – hosted by Aida Mollenkamp
Ayesha's Homemade - hosted by Ayesha Curry

B

B. Smith with Style – hosted by B. Smith
Bake You Rich – hosted by Buddy Valastro
Bakers vs. Fakers
Baker's Dozen – hosted by 13 of America's top bakers, including Flo Braker, Marion Cunningham, and Nick Malgieri
Bama Glama - reality show starring Scot Wedgeworth
Barefoot Contessa – hosted by Ina Garten
BBQ Blitz - hosted by Eddie Jackson
BBQ Brawl - hosted by Bobby Flay, Jet Tila and Anne Burrell
 BBQ USA - hosted by Michael Symon
BBQ with Bobby Flay – hosted by Bobby Flay
Beach Eats USA - hosted by Curtis Stone
Beat Bobby Flay - hosted by Bobby Flay
Behind the Bash – hosted by Giada De Laurentiis
Best Baker in America – hosted by Scott Conant
Best. Ever. - Hosted by Ted Allen
Best in Smoke
The Best Of – hosted by Marc Silverstein and Jill Cordes
The Best of Bill Boggs' Corner Table – hosted by Bill Boggs
The Best Thing I Ever Ate
The Best Thing I Ever Made
Big Cheese
Big Daddy's House – hosted by Aaron McCargo, Jr.
Big Restaurant Bet - hosted by Iron Chef Geoffrey Zakarian
Big Time Bake
The Big Waste – hosted by Anne Burrell, Bobby Flay, Alex Guarnaschelli and Michael Symon
Bobby Flay's Barbecue Addiction - hosted by Bobby Flay
Bobby's Dinner Battle - hosted by Bobby Flay
Bobby's Triple Threats - hosted by Bobby Flay
Bocuse d'Or: A Chef's Dream - cooking competition
Boy Meets Grill – hosted by Bobby Flay
 Breakaway Camp with Martha Stewart - hosted by Martha Stewart
 Brunch at Bobby's  hosted by Bobby Flay
B. Smith with Style - hosted by B. Smith
Bubba-Q
Buddy vs. Duff
Buddy's Family Vacation - hosted by Buddy Valastro
 Burgers, Brew,& Que- hosted by Michael Symon
Buy This Restaurant - hosted by Keith Simpson

C

Cake Masters - hosted by Duff Goldman
Cake Wars - hosted by Jonathan Bennett
Cake Wars: Christmas - hosted by Jonathan Bennett
Caketastrophea
Calling All Cooks – hosted by Curtis Aikens, Ceci Carmichael, Cathy Ballou, and Eric Boardman
Candy Land - hosted by Kristin Chenoweth
Cake Hunters
Carnival Cravings with Anthony Anderson - hosted by Anthony Anderson
Calorie Commando – hosted by Juan-Carlos Cruz
Challenge - hosted by Claire Robinson
Chef du Jour – hosted by a different guest chef every day
Chef Hunter
The Chef Jeff Project – hosted by Jeff Henderson
Chef Marks the Spot
Chef Wanted with Anne Burrell  – hosted by Anne Burrell
Chefography – a series of biographies on Food Network star chefs
Chefs vs. City – hosted by Chris Cosentino and Aarón Sanchez
Chew On This – hosted by Lenore Skenazy
Chic and Easy with Mary Nolan – hosted by Mary Nolan
Chocolate with Jacques Torres – hosted by Jacques Torres
Chopped - an elimination cooking series, hosted by Ted Allen
Chopped After Hours
Chopped Canada
Chopped Junior - hosted by Ted Allen
Chopped Sweets – hosted by Scott Conant
Christmas at Bobby's – hosted by Bobby Flay
Christmas Cookie Challenge – hosted by Eddie Jackson
Ciao America With Mario Batali – hosted by Mario Batali
Clash of the Grandmas - hosted by Ryan Scott ; Cameron Mathison 
 Cookie Wars - hosted by Jonathan Bennett
Cooking for Real – hosted by Sunny Anderson
Cooking Live – a call-in cooking show hosted by Sara Moulton
Cooking Live Primetime – hosted by Sara Moulton
Cooking Loft – hosted by Alex Guarnaschelli
Cooking Monday to Friday – hosted by Michele Urvater
Cooking School Stories – documentary
Cooking Right – hosted by John Ash
Cooking Thin – hosted by Kathleen Daelemans
A Cook's Tour – hosted by Anthony Bourdain
Cooks vs. Cons – hosted by Geoffrey Zakarian
Cookworks – hosted by Donna Dooher
Corner Table With Bill Boggs – celebrities interviewed by Bill Boggs
The Cowboys' Kitchen - hosted by Grady Spears
Cupcake Championship – hosted by Kardea Brown
Cupcake Wars - hosted by Justin Willman
Cutthroat Kitchen - hosted by Alton Brown

D

Daphne Dishes – hosted by Daphne Brogdon
Date Plate – hosted by Kelly Deadmon, with chefs Ralph Pallarino, Cat Cora, Cheryl Smith, and Daisuke Utagawa
Dave Does – hosted by Dave Lieberman; webseries
Dear Food Network – specials
Delicious Miss Brown – hosted by Kardea Brown
Dessert First with Anne Thornton – hosted by Anne Thornton
Dessert Games - spin off of Guy's Grocery Games hosted by Duff Goldman
The Dessert Show – hosted by Debbi Fields, founder of Mrs. Field's Cookies
Diners, Drive-Ins and Dives – hosted by Guy Fieri
Dining Around – hosted by Nina Griscom and Bill Boggs, later replaced by Alan Richman
Dinner: Impossible – hosted by Robert Irvine, later replaced by Michael Symon, back to Robert Irvine
Door-Knock Dinners – hosted by Gordon Elliott
Down Home with the Neelys – hosted by Pat and Gina Neely
Duff Takes the Cake – hosted by Duff Goldman
Duff Till Dawn – hosted by Duff Goldman
Dweezil and Lisa – hosted by Dweezil Zappa and Lisa Loeb

E

East Meets West With Ming Tsai – hosted by Ming Tsai
Easy Entertaining with Michael Chiarello – hosted by Michael Chiarello
Eat St - hosted by Canadian comedian James Cunningham
Eating Out Loud - hosted by Ruth Reichl
Emeril Live – hosted by Emeril Lagasse; production ceased December 11, 2007
Emeril's Florida – hosted by Emeril Lagasse
Entertaining at Home with Dean Fearing – hosted by Dean Fearing
Essence of Emeril – hosted by Emeril Lagasse
Everyday Italian – hosted by Giada De Laurentiis, replaced by Giada at Home in 2008
Extreme Chef – hosted by Marsh Mokhtari
Extreme Cuisine – hosted by Jeff Corwin

F

Family Style – reality show following Joey and Melissa Maggiore
Family Restaurant Rivals – hosted by Valerie Bertinelli
Farmhouse Rules - hosted by Nancy Fuller
Fat Chef 
Feasting on Asphalt – hosted by Alton Brown
Feasting on Asphalt 2: The River Run – hosted by Alton Brown
Feasting on Waves – hosted by Alton Brown
Feeding Your Family on $99 A Week – hosted by Michele Urvater
Fixing Dinner – hosted by Sandi Richard
Follow That Food – hosted by Gordon Elliott
Food 911 – hosted by Tyler Florence
Food Court Wars - hosted by Tyler Florence
Food Detectives – hosted by Ted Allen
Food Fantasy – hosted by Robin Dorian
Food Feuds  – hosted by Michael Symon
Food Fight  – competition between everyday people
Food Finds – hosted by Sandra Pinckney
Food Fortunes – hosted by Willie Degel, Pat LaFrieda Jr., and Robert Earl
Food Hunter – hosted by Pete Luckett
Food In A Flash – hosted by Curtis Aikens
Food Jammers – hosted by Micah Donovan, Chris Martin and Nobu Adilman
The Food Lab – yet to premiere
Food Network Challenge – Food Network-sponsored cooking competitions, hosted by Keegan Gerhard; replaced by Claire Robinson in 2010
Food Network Star – the network's flagship show, currently hosted by Bobby Flay and Giada DeLaurentiis
Food Network Star Kids
Food News and Views – hosted by David Rosengarten and Donna Hanover
FoodNation with Bobby Flay – hosted by Bobby Flay
Foods That Changed the World – hosted by Alton Brown, premiered in 2010
Forever Summer – hosted by Nigella Lawson
From Martha's Kitchen – hosted by Martha Stewart
From My Garden – hosted by Curtis Aikens

G

The Galloping Gourmet – hosted by Graham Kerr
Getting Healthy
Giada at Home – replaced Everyday Italian; hosted by Giada De Laurentiis
Giada Entertains – hosted by Giada de Laurentiis
Giada in Italy – hosted by Giada De Laurentiis 
Giada in Paradise – hosted by Giada De Laurentiis 
Giada's Weekend Getaways – hosted by Giada De Laurentiis
Girl Meets Farm – hosted by Molly Yeh
Girl Scout Cookie Championship – hosted by Alyson Hannigan
Giving You the Business
Glutton for Punishment – hosted by Bob Blumer
Good Deal with Dave Lieberman – hosted by Dave Lieberman
Good Eats – hosted by Alton Brown
Good Food Fast with Family Circle – hosted by Ceci Carmichael
Gordon Elliott's Door Knock Dinners – hosted by Gordon Elliott
Gotta Get It – hosted by Sunny Anderson and Marc Istook
Gourmet Getaways – hosted by Robin Leach
The Gourmet Next Door – hosted by Amy Finley
Grape Expectations – a show dedicated to wine
The Great Food Truck Race – hosted by Tyler Florence
Grill It! with Bobby Flay – hosted by Bobby Flay
Grillin' and Chillin – hosted by Bobby Flay and Jack McDavid
Guilty Pleasures
Guy & Hunter's European Vacation – hosted by Guy Fieri and his son Hunter 
Guy Off the Hook – hosted by Guy Fieri
Guy's Big Bite – hosted by Guy Fieri
Guy's Grocery Games – hosted by Guy Fieri
Guy's Ranch Kitchen – hosted by Guy Fieri
Guy's Ultimate Game Night hosted by Guy Fieri
Guy's Chance of a Lifetime - hosted by Guy Fieri

H

Halloween Baking Championship - hosted by Richard Blais (2015) and Jeff Dunham (2016)
Halloween Cake-Off - hosted by Duff Goldman
Halloween Wars
Ham on the Street – hosted by George Duran
Happy Days – hosted by Jamie Oliver
Have Cake, Will Travel – follows Ashley Vicos
Haunted Gingerbread Showdown – hosted by Sandra Lee
Have Fork, Will Travel – hosted by Zane Lamprey
Health Inspectors – hosted by Ben Vaughn
Healthy Appetite with Ellie Krieger – hosted by Ellie Krieger
Heartland Table – hosted by Amy Thielen
Heat Seekers –  hosted by Aarón Sanchez and Roger Mooking
Heavyweights
Holiday Baking Championship - hosted by Bobby Deen
Holiday Gingerbread Showdown
Holiday Wars - hosted by Jonathan Bennett
Hot Off the Grill with Bobby Flay – hosted by Bobby Flay and Jacqui Malouf
How to Boil Water – hosted by Emeril Lagasse 1993–1994, Cathy Lowe and Sean Donnellan 1994–2000, Lynne Koplitz and Frederic van Coppernolle 2000–2003, and Tyler Florence and Jack Hourigan 2003–present
How'd That Get On My Plate? – hosted by Sunny Anderson
The Hungry Detective – hosted by Chris Cognac

I
Ice Brigade – follows Randy Finch
I Hart Food – hosted by Hannah Hart
In Food Today – hosted by Donna Hanover, Bill Boggs, and David Rosengarten
Inside Dish With Rachael Ray – hosted by Rachael Ray
Inside Eats with Rhett & Link – hosted by Rhett & Link
Inside Scoop
Into the Fire – real-life series
Invention Hunters - hosted by Steve Greenberg and Patrick Raymond
Iron Chef – hosted by Takeshi Kaga
Iron Chef America: Battle of the Masters – hosted by Alton Brown, Kevin Brauch and Mark Dacascos
Iron Chef America: The Series – hosted by Alton Brown, Kevin Brauch and Mark Dacascos
Iron Chef Gauntlet – hosted by Alton Brown
It's a Surprise! – hosted by Marc Summers

J

Jamie at Home – hosted by Jamie Oliver
Jamie's Great Italian Escape – hosted by Jamie Oliver
Jamie's Kitchen – hosted by Jamie Oliver
John Ash – hosted by John Ash
Julia Child & Company - hosted by Julia Child
Julia Child & More Company - hosted by Julia Child

K

Keith Famie's Adventures – hosted by Keith Famie
Kelsey's Essentials – hosted by Kelsey Nixon
Kid in a Candy Store – hosted by Adam Gertler
Kids Baking Championship - hosted by Duff Goldman and Valerie Bertinelli
Kids BBQ Championship – hosted by Eddie Jackson and Damaris Phillips
Kids Greatest Moments
Kids Halloween Baking Championship – hosted by Duff Goldman and Alison Sweeney
The Kitchen - hosted by Sunny Anderson, Katie Lee, Jeff Mauro, Marcela Valladolid and Geoffrey Zakarian
Kitchen Accomplished  – hosted by Cat Cora and Peter Marr
Kitchen Casino - hosted by Bill Rancic
Kitchen Inferno – hosted by Curtis Stone
Kitchen Sink  hosts rotate

L

Last Cake Standing
Licence to Grill – hosted by Robert Rainford
Life's a Party with David Burtka – hosted by David Burtka
Lighten Up! – hosted by Janette Barber and Christina Deyo
Low Carb and Lovin' It – hosted by George Stella

M

Man v. Food - hosted by Adam Richman
Marilu's Simple Good Food
Mario Eats Italy – hosted by Mario Batali and Steve Rooney
Mario, Full Boil – special hosted by Mario Batali
 Martina's Table - hosted by Martina McBride
 Mary Makes It Easy - Hosted by Mary Berg
Mealin' & Dealin' – hosted by Ty Barnett
Meals Without Meat – hosted by Curtis Aikens
Meat & Potatoes – hosted by Rahm Fama
Meat Men – hosted by Pat LaFrieda Jr.
Mediterranean Mario – hosted by Mario Batali
Melting Pot  – hosted by Wayne Harley Brachman, Michelle Bernstein, Cat Cora, Rocco DiSpirito, Alex Garcia, Tanya Holland, Padma Lakshmi, Aarón Sanchez, Pilar Sanchez, Priscila Satkoff, Cheryl Smith, and Michael Symon
Me or the Menu
Mexican Made Easy - hosted by Marcela Valladolid
Michael's Place -  hosted by Michael Lomonaco
Ming's Quest – hosted by Ming Tsai
Molto Mario – hosted by Mario Batali
My Country, My Kitchen – hosted by Rick Bayless, Ulrika Bengtsson, Rafih Benjelloun, Michelle Bernstein, Michael Chiarello, Leeann and Katie Chin, Sam Choy, Cat Cora, Ariane Daguin, Rocco DiSpirito, Tyler Florence, Peter Gordon, Maya Kaimal, Michael Lomonaco, Raphael Lunetta, Mai Pham, Jacques Torres, Eric Ripert, and Roy Yamaguchi
My Life In Food – premiered January 3, 2009
Mystery Diners- a scripted show featuring Charles M. Stiles

N

Nadia G's Bitchin' Kitchen – hosted by Nadia Giosia
The Naked Chef – hosted by Jamie Oliver
The Next Iron Chef – hosted by Alton Brown and Mark Dacascos
NFL Tailgate TakedownNickel and Dining – hosted by Greg Grunberg, Duff Goldman, Tia Mowry and Steven WeberNigella Bites – hosted by Nigella LawsonNigella Express – hosted by Nigella LawsonNigella Feasts – hosted by Nigella LawsonNigella's Christmas Kitchen – hosted by Nigella LawsonNot My Mama's Meals – hosted by Bobby DeenNo Recipe Road Trip with the Try Guys – hosted by The Try Guys

OOliver's Twist – hosted by Jamie OliverOn the Rocks – hosted by John GreenOutchef'd - hosted by Eddie JacksonOutrageous Food - hosted by Tom PizzicaOutrageous Pumpkins - hosted by Alyson Hannigan

PParty Line with The Hearty Boys - hosted by Dan Smith and Steve McDonaghParty Starters – hosted by Justin GunnPassion for Dessert with Jacques Torres – hosted by Jacques TorresPasta Monday to Friday – hosted by Michele UrvaterPatricia Heaton Parties - hosted by Patricia HeatonPaula's Best Dishes – replaced Paula's Home Cooking in 2008, hosted by Paula DeenPaula's Home Cooking – hosted by Paula DeenPaula's Party - hosted by Paula DeenPick of the Day – vegetarian cooking show hosted by Curtis AikensThe Pioneer Woman  – hosted by Ree DrummondPlanet Food – hosted by Merrilees Parker, Tyler Florence, Padma Lakshmi, and Ben O'DonoghuePressure Cooker - hosted by Christopher Durham Private Chefs of Beverly HillsPukka Tukka – hosted by Jamie Oliver

QQuick Fix Meals with Robin Miller – hosted by Robin MillerQuench – hosted by Andrea Immer

RRachael Ray Feeds Your Pets – special hosted by Rachael RayRachael Ray's Kids Cook-Off – hosted by Rachael RayRachael Ray's Tasty Travels – hosted by Rachael RayRachael Ray's Week in a Day – hosted by Rachael RayRachael vs. Guy: Celebrity Cook-Off – hosted by Rachael Ray and Guy FieriRachael vs. Guy: Kids Cook-Off – hosted by Rachael Ray and Guy FieriRachael's Vacation – hosted by Rachael RayReady.. Set... Cook! – hosted by Robin Young 1995, Sissy Biggers 1995–2000, and Ainsley Harriott 2000–2001Rebel Eats – hosted by Justin WarnerRecipe for Health – hosted by Lisa Rowland Callahan, MDRecipe for Success – originally hosted by Marlie Hall, then Eric McLendonRescue Chef – hosted by Danny BoomeRestaurant Divided - hosted by Rocco DiSpiritoRestaurant Express - hosted by Robert IrvineRestaurant: Impossible - hosted by Robert IrvineRestaurant Makeover - hosted by Robert Irvine Restaurant Rivals: Irvine vs. Taffer - hosted by Robert Irvine and Jon TafferRestaurant Stakeout - hosted by Willie DegelRidiculous Cakes - hosted by Alton BrownRoad Tasted – hosted by Jamie Deen and Bobby DeenRoad Tasted with The Neelys – hosted by Pat Neely and Gina NeelyThe Road to Bocuse d'Or – competitionRoker on the Road – hosted by Al RokerRuggerio To Go – hosted by David Ruggerio

SSandra's Money-Saving Meals – hosted by Sandra LeeSandra's Restaurant Remakes – hosted by Sandra LeeSandwich King – hosted by Jeff MauroSanta's Baking Blizzard – hosted by Casey WebbSara's Secrets – hosted by Sara MoultonSave My Bakery – hosted by Kerry VincentThe Secret Life Of... – originally hosted by Jim O'Connor, replaced by George DuranSecrets of a Restaurant Chef – hosted by Anne BurrellSemi-Homemade Cooking with Sandra Lee – hosted by Sandra LeeThe ShedSimply Delicioso – hosted by Ingrid HoffmannSouthern at Heart – hosted by Damaris PhillipsSpencer Christian's Wine Cellar – hosted by Spencer ChristianSpice & Easy – hosted by Janet JohnstonSpring Baking Championship – hosted by Bobby DeenSugar Rush – hosted by Warren BrownSummer RushSupermarket Stakeout – hosted by Alex GuarnaschelliThe Surreal Gourmet – hosted by Bob BlumerSweet Baby James – hosted by James MartinSweet Dreams – hosted by Gale GandSweet Genius – hosted by Ron Ben-Israel

TTake It Off (retitled as Weighing In) – hosted by Juan-Carlos CruzTake On the Takeout – hosted by Danny BoomeTalking Food – hosted by Robin LeachTamales World Tour – hosted by Susan Feniger and Mary Sue MillikenTaste – hosted by David RosengartenTaste of LifeTaste Test – quiz show hosted by David RosengartenTasting NapaThe Globe– quiz show hosted by Robert Irvine and Daniela Soto-InnesTen Dollar Dinners – hosted by Melissa d'ArabianTitans of Taste – produced by Al RokerThieves, Inc. – hosted by Connie Ribble and Scott McDonaldThe Thirsty Traveler – hosted by Kevin BrauchThrowdown! with Bobby Flay – hosted by Bobby FlayToo Hot Tamales – hosted by Susan Feniger and Mary Sue MillikenTop 5 – hosted by Bobby RiversTop 5 Restaurants – hosted by Sunny Anderson and Geoffrey ZakarianTournament of Champions - hosted by Guy Fieri
Tournament of Champions II - hosted by Guy Fieri
Tournament of Champions III - hosted by Guy Fieri
Tricked-Out Tailgating – special hosted by Al Roker
Trisha's Southern Kitchen - hosted by Trisha Yearwood
Trivia Unwrapped – hosted by Marc Summers
TV Diners – hosted by Bill Boggs
TV Dinners – hosted by Hugh Fearnley-Whittingstall
Two Fat Ladies – hosted by Jennifer Paterson and Clarissa Dickson Wright
Tyler's Ultimate – hosted by Tyler Florence

U

Ultimate Kitchens – hosted by Tori Ritchie
Ultimate Recipe Showdown – hosted by Marc Summers and Guy Fieri
Ultimate Recipe Showdown 2 – hosted by Guy Fieri
Ultimate Recipe Showdown 3 – hosted by Guy Fieri
Ultimate Thanksgiving Challenge – hosted by Giada De Laurentiis
Unwrapped – hosted by Marc Summers
Unwrapped 2.0 – hosted by Alfonso Ribeiro

V

Valerie's Home Cooking - hosted by Valerie Bertinelli
Vinny & Ma Eat America – hosted by Vinny Guadagnino
Viva Daisy – hosted by Daisy Martinez; premiered January 10, 2009

W

Wedding Cake Championship – hosted by Tara Lipinski and Johnny Weir
Weighing In – hosted by Juan-Carlos Cruz
What America Eats ® with PARADE
What Would Brian Boitano Make? – hosted by Brian Boitano, debuted August 23, 2009
What's Hot!  What's Cool! - hosted by Alli Joseph
Will Work For Food – hosted by Adam Gertler, debuted January 19, 2009
Winner Cake All - hosted by Giada De Laurentiis
Wolfgang Puck – hosted by Wolfgang Puck
Wolfgang Puck's Cooking Class – hosted by Wolfgang Puck
Wolfgang Puck's Master Class – hosted by Wolfgang Puck
Worst Bakers in America - co-hosted by Lorraine Pascale and Duff Goldman, debuted October 2, 2016
Worst Cooks in America – co-hosted by Anne Burrell, Beau MacMillan (Season 1), Robert Irvine (Season 2), Bobby Flay (season 3-5), Tyler Florence (Season 6-); debuted January 3, 2010

See also

List of programs broadcast by Food Network Canada

References

 
Food Network